Senseless is 1998 American romantic comedy film.

Senseless may also refer to:

Senseless violence
Senseless, 2001 novel by Stona Fitch
Senseless, 2005 novel by Andrea Jutson
 Senselessness, the English translation of the 2004 novel Insensatez, originally by Horacio Castellanos
Senseless, 1962 short silent film by Ron Rice
Senseless (2008 film), based on Stona Fitch's novel
Senseless (game show), dating game show on MTV UK
"Senseless" (Law & Order: Criminal Intent), episode of Law & Order: Criminal Intent
"Senseless" (song), a 2018 song by Stefflon Don

See also 
Insensibility (disambiguation)
Insensitive (disambiguation)
Senselessness, English translation of Spanish novel Insensatez
Senseless Acts of Videos, an MTV series featuring stunts by Troy Hartman